Ranunculus pensylvanicus is a flowering plant species in the buttercup family, Ranunculaceae. Common names include bristly buttercup, bristly crowfoot and Pennsylvania buttercup. It is native to North America with a distribution over the northern part of the continent.

References

pensylvanicus
Plants described in 1781
Flora of North America